James Franklin Busby (January 8, 1927 – July 8, 1996) was an American center fielder and coach in Major League Baseball who played with the Chicago White Sox (1950–52, 1955), Washington Senators (1952–55), Cleveland Indians (1956–57), Baltimore Orioles (1957–58, 1960–61), Boston Red Sox (1959–60) and Houston Colt .45's (1962).

Busby was born in Kenedy, Texas, and attended Texas Christian University. 

A cousin, Steve Busby, was a starting pitcher for the Kansas City Royals between 1972–80.

Jim Busby was signed by the White Sox in 1948 and made his major league debut early during the  season. A fast runner and a good contact hitter, Busby compiled his best offensive seasons early in his career, exceeding the .280 batting mark in 1951,  (when he hit a career-best .312) and 1954. He also drove in 80 or more RBI during both 1953—54. But he earned a reputation as a superb defensive outfielder who committed only 42 errors in 3,394 total chances (.988) over his lengthy career. He was an American League All-Star in 1951.

In all or parts of 13 MLB seasons, Busby batted .262, with 48 home runs, 438 runs batted in, 541 runs, 1,113 hits, 162 doubles, 35 triples, and 97 stolen bases in 1,352 games played. Defensively, he recorded a .988 fielding percentage as a center fielder.

When his career ended, in the middle of the  season, he became a full-time coach with Houston (through 1967), then spent eight seasons (1968–75) on the staff of the Atlanta Braves, before returning to the American League to finish his coaching career with the White Sox (1976) and Seattle Mariners (1977–78).

As a player and coach, Busby had a 29-year MLB career. 

He died in Augusta, Georgia, at 69 years of age.

References

External links

The Deadball Era

1927 births
1996 deaths
American League All-Stars
Atlanta Braves coaches
Baltimore Orioles players
Baseball players from Texas
Boston Red Sox players
Chicago White Sox coaches
Chicago White Sox players
Chicago White Sox scouts
Cleveland Indians players
Houston Astros coaches
Houston Colt .45s coaches
Houston Colt .45s players
Major League Baseball center fielders
Major League Baseball third base coaches
Miami Marlins (IL) players
Muskegon Clippers players
Oklahoma City 89ers players
People from Kenedy, Texas
Sacramento Solons players
Seattle Mariners coaches
TCU Horned Frogs baseball players
Washington Senators (1901–1960) players
Waterloo White Hawks players